Joseph McKeehen (born June 28, 1991) is an American professional poker player and mind sports player from North Wales, Pennsylvania. In 2015 he won the World Series of Poker Main Event, earning $7,683,346.

McKeehen attended high school at La Salle College High School, then graduated from Arcadia University with a math degree. 

In 2010 he won the world championship in the board game Risk, the Risk Annual Classic. 

McKeehen played poker online while being underaged until he could start playing live tournaments at the age of 18.

McKeehen's first poker title came in 2012, when he won a side event at the PokerStars Caribbean Adventure for $116,230. In March 2013, he won the WSOP Circuit event in Atlantic City, New Jersey, earning $174,147. That year he cashed in the WSOP Main Event for the first time, finishing in 489th place. Prior to the 2015 Main Event, McKeehen's largest cash came for a 2nd-place finish in the Monster Stack event at the 2014 World Series of Poker, where he earned $820,863.

At the 2015 WSOP Main Event, McKeehen made the November Nine with the chip lead and nearly a third of the chips in play. Throughout the final table, he never relinquished the chip lead and defeated Josh Beckley heads-up with  against  for $7.683 million.

In January 2016, McKeehen finished runner-up to Bryn Kenney in the $100,000 Super High Roller event at the PokerStars Caribbean Adventure, earning $1,220,480.

In April 2016, McKeehen appeared on an episode of season 4 of Poker Night in America, on CBS Sports.

In July 2016, he finished 6th in WSOP  $111,111 No Limit Hold'em High Roller for One Drop for $829,792. McKeehen captured his second WSOP bracelet in 2017, winning the $10,000 Limit Hold'em World Championship.

As of June 2020, McKeehen's total live tournament winnings exceed $16,600,000. His 43 WSOP cashes account for $10,857,294 of those earnings.

World Series of Poker bracelets

An "O" following a year denotes bracelet(s) won during the World Series of Poker Online

References

External links
Joe McKeehen Interview

1991 births
American poker players
World Series of Poker Main Event winners
World Series of Poker bracelet winners
Arcadia University alumni
People from Montgomery County, Pennsylvania
Living people